The 488th Bombardment Squadron is an inactive United States Air Force unit.  It was last assigned to the 340th Bombardment Wing at Whiteman Air Force Base, Missouri, where it was inactivated on 1 September 1963.

History

World War II
Established as a North American B-25 Mitchell medium bomber squadron in mid-1942, trained by Third Air Force in the southeastern United States.  Deployed to IX Bomber Command in Egypt initially in March 1943 via Air Transport Command South Atlantic Route through Caribbean, Brazil, Liberia, Central Africa and Sudan, then reassigned to Mediterranean Theater of Operations, and to XII Bomber Command in Tunisia.   Supported Allied ground forces in Tunisian Campaign; participated in Invasions of Sicily and Italy during 1943, supporting Allied ground forces with tactical bombing of enemy targets.   Participated in liberation of Corsica during the spring of 1944, then returned to Italy engaging in attacks on enemy ground forces and targets in the Po Valley during the spring of 1945.

This was the squadron Joseph Heller flew in as a bombardier, his experiences leading him to write the famous anti-war novel, Catch-22.

Personnel demobilized in Italy during summer of 1945; squadron returned to the United States, being prepared for deployment to Pacific Theater for use as a tactical bomb squadron in programmed Invasion of Japan.   Japanese capitulation led to squadron's inactivation in November 1945.

Reserve operations
Activated as a light bomber squadron in the postwar Air Force reserves in 1947; inactivated in 1949 due to budget reductions.

Strategic Air Command
Reactivated in October 1952 as a Strategic Air Command (SAC) Boeing B-47 Stratojet squadron.   Initially equipped with prototypes of the Boeing RB-47B Stratojet (YRB-47) to perform long-range photo-reconnaissance with a flight of Boeing B-29 Superfortress bombers assigned. In November 1953 began to receive production B-47E medium bomber aircraft; prototype reconnaissance aircraft already received exchanged for medium bomber versions. Participated in SAC Reflex deployments to Europe and North Africa throughout the 1950s and 1960s.

In 1963 with the phaseout of the B-47 the aircraft sent to storage at Davis–Monthan and inactivated.

Lineage
 Constituted as the 488th Bombardment Squadron (Medium)' on 10 August 1942
 Activated on 20 August 1942
 Redesignated 488th Bombardment Squadron, Medium c. 20 August 1943
 Inactivated on 7 November 1945
 Redesignated 488th Bombardment Squadron, Light on 8 October 1947
 Activated in the reserve on 31 October 1947
 Inactivated on 19 August 1949
 Redesignated 488th Bombardment Squadron, Medium' on 3 October 1952
 Activated on 20 October 1952
 Inactivated on 1 September 1963

Assignments
 340th Bombardment Group, 20 August 1942 – 7 November 1945
 340th Bombardment Group, 31 October 1947 – 19 August 1949
 340th Bombardment Wing, 20 October 1952 – 1 September 1963

Stations

 Columbia Army Air Base, South Carolina, 20 August 1942
 Walterboro Army Air Field, South Carolina, 1 December 1942 – 30 January 1943
 RAF Kabrit, Egypt, 29 March 1943
 Medenine Airfield, Tunisia, c. 13 April 1943
 Sfax Airfield, Tunisia, 16 April 1943
 Hergla Airfield, Tunisia, 3 June 1943
 Comiso Airfield, Sicily, Italy, c. 2 August 1943
 Catania Airport, Sicily, Italy, 27 August 1943
 San Pancrazio Airfield, Italy 29 October 1943

 Foggia Airfield, Italy, 25 November 1943
 Pompeii Airfield, Italy, 2 January 1944
 Gaudo Airfield, Italy, 22 March 1944
 Alesani Airfield, Corsica, France, c. 11 April 1944
 Rimini Airfield, Italy, 7 April – 16 July 1945
 Seymour Johnson Field, North Carolina, 9 August 1945
 Columbia Army Air Base, South Carolina, c. 2 October – 7 November 1945
 Tulsa Municipal Airport, Oklahoma, 31 October 1947 – 19 August 1949
 Sedalia Air Force Base (later Whiteman Air Force Base), Missouri, 20 October 1952 – 1 September 1963

Aircraft
 North American B-25 Mitchell, 1942–1945
 Boeing YRB-47 Stratojet, 1954–1955
 Boeing B-47 Stratojet, 1955–1963

References

Notes
 Explanatory notes

 Citations

Bibliography

External links
Lt Col Francis Yohannan Find a Grave
Joseph Heller find a grave

Bombardment squadrons of the United States Air Force
Military units and formations in Missouri
Bombardment squadrons of the United States Army Air Forces
Military units and formations established in 1942